RAF refers to the Royal Air Force, the air force of the United Kingdom.

RAF or Raf may also refer to:

Military and paramilitary
Rapid Action Force, India, paramilitary police
Royal Aircraft Factory, UK, 1912–1918
Russian Armed Forces, the Russian military
Russian Air Force, the air force of Russia

Organizations
Recreational Aviation Foundation, United States
Red Army Faction, a left-wing militant group in West Germany
Riga Autobus Factory, a factory in Latvia
Road Accident Fund, South Africa
Rodez AF or le Raf, a French football club
Russian Automobile Federation, a Russian motorist association

People
Raf (comics) (1928-1997), Spanish comic author
Raf (singer) (born 1959), Italian singer
RAF Camora (born 1984), Austrian rapper
Raf de Gregorio (born 1977), New Zealand soccer player
Raf Simons (born 1968), Belgian fashion designer
Raf Vallone (1916–2002), Italian actor
Raf., taxonomic author abbreviation of Constantine Samuel Rafinesque (1783–1840), French polymath

Other uses
R.A.F. (film), a 1935 British documentary film
"Raf" (song), a song by 2017 by ASAP Mob
Raf kinase
Retired after finishing, a sailing race term

See also
Royal Air Force (disambiguation), several air forces
Raff